Margaret Clark-Williams (1910-1975) was an American psychoanalyst, who worked as a lay analyst in both France and England.

Career
Having first come to France in her early twenties, Clark-Williams was subsequently analysed in the States by Raymond de Saussure; before returning to Paris after the second world war, studying psychology with Daniel Lagache, and finding (voluntary) work as a child therapist.

A celebrated series of trial at the start of the fifties saw her right to practice therapeutically as a non-medic challenged in the French courts: after a first acquittal, she was on appeal fined a symbolic franc.  Although the ruling only related in her private, unsupervised practice of child therapy, Clark-Williams thereafter left France for England, with its more receptive stance towards lay analysis.

See also

References

1910 births
1975 deaths
Women and psychology
American psychoanalysts
American expatriates in France
American expatriates in England